Magic formula may refer to:

Magical formula
Magic formula investing
Magic formula (Swiss politics), an arithmetic formula for dividing the seven executive seats on the Federal Council among the four coalition parties in Switzerland